Kim Song-guk (김성국; ; born 5 October 1985) is a North Korean sports shooter. He won the bronze medal in the men's 50 metre pistol at the 2016 Summer Olympics. He also competed in the men's 10 metre air pistol event.

References

External links
 

1985 births
Living people
North Korean male sport shooters
Olympic shooters of North Korea
Shooters at the 2016 Summer Olympics
Place of birth missing (living people)
Medalists at the 2016 Summer Olympics
Olympic bronze medalists for North Korea
Olympic medalists in shooting
Shooters at the 2018 Asian Games
Asian Games competitors for North Korea